Ewan McKenzie (born 11 January 1959) is a British cross-country skier. He competed in the men's 30 kilometre classical event at the 1988 Winter Olympics.

References

External links
 

1959 births
Living people
British male cross-country skiers
Olympic cross-country skiers of Great Britain
Cross-country skiers at the 1988 Winter Olympics
People from Badenoch and Strathspey